Parukářka Park is a park in Žižkov, Prague, Czech Republic.

References

External links

 

Parks in Prague
Žižkov